James Alexander Malcolm Caldwell (27 September 1931 – 23 December 1978) was a Scottish academic and a prolific Marxist writer. He was a consistent critic of American foreign policy, a campaigner for Asian communist and socialist movements and a supporter of the Khmer Rouge. Caldwell was murdered under mysterious circumstances a few hours after meeting Pol Pot in Cambodia.

Early life and career
Malcolm Caldwell was born in Stirling, Scotland, the son of an architect. The family moved to Kirkcudbright where his father, Archibald Thomson Caldwell was appointed the County Architect for Kirkcudbrightshire; a post he held from 1950 until his early death in 1957. Malcolm was educated at Kirkcudbright Academy where he was Dux in 1949.   He obtained degrees from University of Nottingham and University of Edinburgh. He completed two years' national service in the British army, becoming a sergeant in the Army Education Corps. In 1959 he joined the School of Oriental and African Studies at the University of London as a Research Fellow. Although he met with conservative opposition within the School, he remained on its faculty throughout his life. As well as being an academic, he was an energetic and committed radical political activist. He was chair of the UK Campaign for Nuclear Disarmament from 1968-1970. He was dedicated to criticising Western foreign policy and capitalist economics, paying particular attention to American policy. He was a founding editor of the Journal of Contemporary Asia, a journal concerned with revolutionary movements in Asia. In 1978 Caldwell was one of the Labour Party candidates in St Mary's ward in the local elections for the Bexley London Borough Council.

Murder in Cambodia
Caldwell was one of the staunchest defenders of the Pol Pot regime. He frequently attempted to downplay reports of mass executions by the Khmer Rouge in Cambodia and was widely criticized by many authorities for doing so.

In December 1978, Caldwell was a member, along with Elizabeth Becker and Richard Dudman, of one of the few groups of Western journalists and writers invited to visit Cambodia since the Khmer Rouge had taken power in April 1975. The three visitors were given a highly structured tour of the country. "We traveled in a bubble," wrote Becker. "No one was allowed to speak to me freely." On 22 December, Caldwell had a private audience with Pol Pot, the leader of Cambodia. After the meeting, he came back to the guest house in Phnom Penh where the three were staying in a mood described as "euphoric". At about 11:00 p.m. that night Becker was awakened by the sound of gunfire. She stepped out of her bedroom and saw a heavily armed Cambodian man who pointed a pistol at her. She ran back into her room and heard people moving and more gunshots. An hour later a Cambodian came to her bedroom door and told her that Caldwell was dead. She and Dudman went to his room. He had been shot in the chest and the body of a Cambodian man was also in the room, possibly the same man who had pointed the pistol at Becker.

The motives for Caldwell's murder remain unexplained. Andrew Anthony, writing in The Guardian, notes: "Certainly there must have been some kind of in-house involvement, as the guests were guarded. But who instructed the guards, and why they did so, remains a subject of speculation." Journalist Wilfred Burchett and some of Caldwell's family members believe that Caldwell was killed on the orders of Pol Pot, possibly following a disagreement between the two during their meeting. This belief was also shared by Australian historian and friend of Caldwell Keith Windschuttle, who claimed that Caldwell had been shot by 'two of Pol Pot's henchmen'.  Alternatively, four of the guards at the guest house were arrested and two of them "confessed" after torture at the Khmer Rouge's S-21 prison that the killers were subversives attempting to undermine the Khmer Rouge regime and that Caldwell was killed "to prevent the Party from gathering friends in the world". Three days after Caldwell was killed, the Vietnamese invaded Cambodia and soon put an end to the Khmer Rouge government. According to Becker, "Malcolm Caldwell's death was caused by the madness of the regime he openly admired."

Works

(1979) Lee Kuan Yew: The Man, His Mayoralty and His Mafia.

See also

 List of unsolved murders
 Cambodian genocide denial
 Vann Nath
 Chum Mey
 Sean Flynn
 Dana Stone
 Stuart Robert Glass
 François Bizot
 François Ponchaud

References

External links
An account of the night Caldwell was killed excerpted from Becker's When the War was Over
Andrew Anthony "Lost in Cambodia", The Observer, 10 January 2010
Michael Ezra "Malcolm Caldwell: Pol Pot's Apologist", Democratiya, No. 16, Spring/Summer 2009 (.pdf)

1931 births
1978 deaths
Academics of SOAS University of London
Alumni of the University of Edinburgh
British communists
British people murdered abroad
Campaign for Nuclear Disarmament activists
Deaths by firearm in Cambodia
Male murder victims
People who died in the Cambodian genocide
Unsolved murders in Cambodia